The Boconó Fault is a complex of geological faults located in the Eastern Ranges of northeastern Colombia and the Mérida Andes of northwestern Venezuela. The fault has a NE-SW orientation; it is a strike-slip fault and has a dextral relative movement.

References

Bibliography

Further reading 
 

Seismic faults of Colombia
Seismic faults of Venezuela
Strike-slip faults
Active faults
Faults
Faults
Faults
Faults
Colombia–Venezuela border